Denmark has three general speed limits:
 50 km/h within towns
 80 km/h outside towns
 130 km/h on motorways

The general speed limits for driving with trailers are:
 50 km/h within towns
 80 km/h outside towns
 80 km/h on motorways

Some areas may have lower or higher speed limits. Also the general speed limits apply only for vehicles below 3.5 metric tons. Lower speed limits apply for larger vehicles.

References 

 Bekendtgørelse af færdselsloven (Danish)

Denmark
Transport in Denmark